HMS Sanguine was an S-class submarine of the Royal Navy, and part of the Third Group built of that class. She was built by Cammell Laird and launched on 15 February 1945. So far she has been the only ship of the Royal Navy to bear the name Sanguine.

Built as the Second World War was drawing to a close, she did not see much action. In 1953 she took part in the Fleet Review to celebrate the Coronation of Queen Elizabeth II.

Israeli Navy as Rahav

Sanguine was sold to the Israeli Navy in 1958 and renamed Rahav in March 1959, after the mythical sea-monster Rahab. Not operational during the Six-Day War, she was retired in 1968 and cannibalised for spare parts for Tanin, formerly , Rahavs sister ship which did see combat in 1967.

Legacy
A  named Rahav served with the Israeli Navy from 1977 to 1997. The   was delivered to the Israeli Navy on 29 April 2013.

References

Publications
 

 

British S-class submarines (1931)
Ships built on the River Mersey
1945 ships
Royal Navy ship names
British S-class submarines (1931) of the Israeli Navy